Pari Esfandiari is the co-founder and president of the Global TechnoPolitics Forum and CEO of Pario. She is a member of the At Large Advisory Committee (ALAC) at the ICANN, representing European region (Euralo), as well as a member of the GeoTech Action Council at the Atlantic Council. In addition, she serves at the APCO Worldwide’s International Advisory Council. She was a non-resident senior fellow at the Atlantic Council.

Esfandiari is an entrepreneur, internet pioneer and sustainable development executive. She has worked across diverse industries ranging from FinTech, e-commerce and smart cities. Her social enterprise was showcased by UNESCO and supported by Google Foundation for supporting women’s role in sustainable development. Esfandiari holds a doctorate from Oxford Brookes University in sustainability business. 

Her latest publication is a major study on "Data:Governance and Geopolitics".

Publications 

 Data: Governance and Geopolitics (with Gregory F. Treverton) (CSIS, 2021).

 Fighting Covid and an attempted coup: the shining moments of 2020 (with Gregory F. Treverton) (the Article, 2021).

 Mark Zuckerberg, meet Jean-Jacques Rousseau? (with Gregory F. Treverton and John Walcott) (the Hill, 2021).

 American Democracy Held (with Gregory F. Treverton) (Global TechnoPolitics Forum).

 Foreign Policy on the Home Front (with Gregory F. Treverton and John Walcott).

 Why data governance matters: Use, trade, intellectual property, and diplomacy (with Gregory F. Treverton) (Atlantic Council, 2020).

 Remembering history so not to repeat it (with Gregory F. Treverton) (the Article, 2020).

 The Iran crisis- the US has no strategy (with Gregory F. Treverton) (the Article, 2020).

 The intelligence did not justify Soleimani’s assassination (with Gregory F. Treverton) (the Article, 2020).

 Viewing tech giants as a geopolitical force (with Gregory F. Treverton) (the Hill, 2020).

 Data has paralleled oil in becoming an intensely political national security issue (with Gregory F. Treverton) (the Hill, 2019).

References

External links 

 Appears in Oxford Internet Institute: https://www.oii.ox.ac.uk/videos/80172/

 Appears in ICANN EURALO - https://icann.zoom.us/rec/play/UM8Gf7rp-wmku0SfxgYc1L5V9D1K1wj72jcPaJp45ygJLN-pPh21EzMrp_Qt01ncLaqEmvU-hd3RWV7e.8Gc6m0CuxmqBZubv?startTime=1621965678000&_x_zm_rtaid=PMXIjF1bQh-S-RWiLAVckw.1622581221813.def09b72abbcf8eb4366f1557b6fbf3f&_x_zm_rhtaid=645

Alumni of Oxford Brookes University
CSIS people
Atlantic Council
21st-century businesspeople
Living people
Year of birth missing (living people)